Edward Peacock may refer to:

 Edward Gryffydh Peacock (1826–1867), English rower and writer
 Edward Robert Peacock (1871–1962), Canadian merchant banker
 Edward Peacock (antiquary) (1831–1915), English antiquarian and novelist

See also
Edward Woodruffe-Peacock